Manuel Cipriano Dulanto (July 17, 1801 – March 17, 1867) was a Peruvian politician and military man.

He fought in several battles participating with Jose de San Martin and Simon Bolivar.

He was a colonel of the Army and also first Mayor, Governor and Senator of Callao.

His parents were José Dulanto y Bernardina Valenzuela.

He granted a ship to the Peruvian War Navy and equipped a battalion for the defense. He also built hospitals, hospices, schools, from his own assets.
He was an illustrious Freemason. The Chamber of Installed Master Masons of Callao bears his name.

Peruvian soldiers
People from Callao
Peruvian politicians
1801 births
1867 deaths
Mayors of Callao
Freemasons